John Jones (November 3, 1816 - May 21, 1878) was an African American freedman who settled in Alton, Illinois and then Chicago where he opened a tailoring shop and became a leading campaigner for the rights of African Americans. He eventually became an elected official.

Jones was born in Greene County, North Carolina. He was a leading activist against Black Laws, discrimination, segregation, and for suffrage and civil rights. He was a civic leader, political appointee, and one of the first elected African American officials in Chicago: he was elected a Cook County commissioner in 1871, and re-elected for a three-year term in 1872 .

The Chicago Museum of History has a photograph of Jones as well as a painted portrait by Aaron E. Darling of Jones. The museum also has a painted portrait of his wife by the same artist. The site of their house is a city landmark.

References

1816 births
1878 deaths
Politicians from Chicago
People from Greene County, North Carolina
Members of the Cook County Board of Commissioners
African-American people in Illinois politics
19th-century American politicians